Alice Elizabeth Motion (born Alice Williamson, 28 October 1984) is a British chemist, science communicator, and associate professor at the School of Chemistry, University of Sydney. She is the founder of the Breaking Good project which encourages high school and undergraduate students to take part in research that can benefit human health. In 2018, the Breaking Good project was a finalist on the Google.org Impact Challenge.

Education

Motion received her MChem from the University of Leeds in 2007 where she worked with Philip Kocienski on the synthesis of an N-acetylcolchinol-combretastatin hybrid. She moved to the University of Cambridge where she obtained her PhD in 2012 while working with Matthew J. Gaunt on strategies for asymmetric arylation.

Career

In 2012, Motion moved to the University of Sydney in Australia to work with Matthew H. Todd on the Open Source Malaria project as Postdoctoral Research Fellow. In 2014, she became a Postdoctoral Teaching Fellow at the same institution until her promotion to Lecturer in Chemical Education and Outreach at the same institution in 2017.

Pyrimethamine is a pharmaceutical medicine used in combination with leucovorin to treat toxoplasmosis and cystoisosporiasis and in combination with dapsone to prevent Pneumocystis jiroveci pneumonia in HIV/AIDS patients. In 2015, Turing Pharmaceuticals drastically increased the price of pyrimethamine, which it markets as Daraprim, from about US$13.50 to $750 per tablet.  In response, Motion, along with her academic advisor, Matthew H. Todd, and the Open Source Malaria team led a small team of high school students from Sydney Grammar School to synthesise the drug. The team produced 3.7 grams of pyrimethamine for under US$20, which would be worth between $US35,000 and $US110,000 in the United States according to Turing Pharmaceuticals's pricing. This received significant media attention and was featured in The Guardian and Time magazine, and on ABC News (Australia), the BBC, and CNN.

Motion, like her former research advisor, is a proponent of open science. She believes that open science and research provides transparency of data and results that prevent unnecessary duplication.

In December 2022 Motion was appointed interim director of Sydney Nano.

Honours and awards

2015 – ABC RN and UNSW Top 5 Under 40
2017 and 2018 – RACI Nyholm Lectureship: "Mother Nature's Molecules – the good, the bad and the ugly"
2020 – Celestino Eureka Prize for Promoting Understanding of Science

See also 

 Open access
 Open collaboration
 Open innovation
 Open science data
 Open research
 Open-source model

References

External links

Breaking Good
Open Source Malaria
Open Source Malaria on GitHub

English chemists
Women chemists
Organic chemists
Living people
Academic staff of the University of Sydney
1984 births
Science communicators